Six ships of the Royal Navy have borne the name HMS St Lawrence:

  was a schooner purchased in 1764 and burnt after being struck by lightning in 1766.
  was a 10-gun schooner purchased in 1767, decommissioned in 1775, and sold in 1776.
  was a schooner purchased in 1775 and sold in 1783.
  was a 12-gun schooner, formerly the American privateer Atlas.  She was captured in 1813, but recaptured by the American privateer  in 1815.
  was a 112-gun first rate launched in 1814 and sold in 1832.
She was converted into a receiving ship and renamed HMS St Lawrence in 1844, and was broken up in 1859.

See also
 Ships of the Royal Canadian Navy named 

Royal Navy ship names